Sliddery (Gaelic: Slaodraidh) is a tiny hamlet located on the Southwest coast of the Isle of Arran in Scotland. The village is situated near the Ross road between Lagg and Blackwaterfoot.

The name Sliddery is thought to have been derived from the Gaelic denoting dragging or trailing, but another story has it that it was here that a band of marauding Vikings were butchered when attempting to settle in Sliddery Water valley and that the name has something to do with slaughter or massacre.

Various lanes lead down to a pebble beach, which offers views across the Kilbrannan Sound to Ireland and Ailsa Craig.

External links

Canmore - Arran, Sliddery, General site record
Canmore - Arran, Sliddery Bridge site record

Villages in the Isle of Arran